Traffic mix is a traffic model in telecommunication engineering and teletraffic theory.

Definitions
A traffic mix is a modelisation of user behaviour. In telecommunications, user behaviour activities may be described by a number of systems, ranging from simple to complex. For example, for plain old telephone service (POTS), a sequence of connection requests to an exchange can be modelled by fitting negative exponential distributions to the average time between requests and the average duration of a connection. This in turn can be used to work out the utilisation of the line for the purposes of network planning and dimensioning.

Objectives
Traffic mix has two goals:
 Network links dimensioning
 Network equipment dimensioning

Both these functions are extremely important to network operators. If insufficient capability is deployed at a node (for example, if a backbone router has 1 gigabit/sec of switching capacity and more than this is offered) then the risk of equipment failure increases, and customers experience poor service. However, if the network is overprovisioned the cost in equipment can be high. Most providers therefore seek to maximise the effect of their spending by maintaining an unused overhead capacity for growth, and expanding key nodes to relieve problem areas. Identification of these areas is accomplished by network dimensioning.

Traffic mix type

Telephony traffic mix
 Call attempts per day
 Call holding time
 Mean holding time

Mobile telephony traffic mix
 Call attempts
 Call holding time
 Mean holding time
 Mean number of SMS send
 Mean number of SMS received
 User mobility

Internet traffic mix
 UL/DL acknowledged Kbs
 Packet Data Channel allocation successes
 User throughput
 Session/Packet interarrival time/Latency

See also
 A. K. Erlang
 Call center
 Engset calculation
 Erlang distribution
 Poisson distribution

External links
 Competitive ISP - Scientific treatment of internet Traffic

Teletraffic
Telecommunications engineering